Niranjan Sengupta (26 July 1904 - 4 September 1969) was a Bengali Indian revolutionary and freedom fighter. He was a leader of Communist Party of India (Marxist).

Revolutionary activities
The first elected student union in India was at Ripon College with Niranjan Sengupta as its president. Niranjan was a leader of the Barisal branch of Dhaka Anushilan Samiti. In 1929, he was one of the leaders who led to the formation of the neo-violence confederation. In 1930, in connection with the Mechuabazar Bomb Case, he got arrested with 23 others. In 1932, He was sent to the Andaman Cellular jail with other revolutionaries where he became acquainted with Communist ideas.

Later he became a Marxist and joined the Communist Party of India in 1938. He was one of the seven members of an inner committee set up by the Communist Party of India Politburo. He also had important role during the inner-party struggle of this communist party. He was elected as a member of Legislative Assembly of West Bengal in 1957 election from Bijpur. After the split in the Communist Party of India, Niranjan remained with the Communist Party of India (Marxist) (CPI(M)). He was also a minister in the coalition ministry of West Bengal in 1967 - 1968 and 1969.

Notes

External links
 Muktadhara article

Anushilan Samiti
Revolutionary movement for Indian independence
Indian revolutionaries
People from Barisal District
University of Calcutta alumni
1903 births
1969 deaths
Communist Party of India politicians from West Bengal